Hazel Valley is an unincorporated community in Reed Township, Washington County, Arkansas, United States. It is located along County Route 47 (Hazel Valley Road) northeast of Winslow.

A post office was in operation at Hazel Valley from 1875 until 1951.

References

Unincorporated communities in Washington County, Arkansas
Unincorporated communities in Arkansas